The 1947 Tour de France was the 34th edition of Tour de France, one of cycling's Grand Tours. The Tour began in Paris with a flat stage on 25 June, and Stage 11 occurred on 7 July with a flat stage to Marseille. The race finished in Paris on 20 July.

Stage 1
25 June 1947 — Paris to Lille,

Stage 2
26 June 1947 — Lille to Brussels (Belgium),

Stage 3
27 June 1947 — Brussels (Belgium) to Luxembourg City (Luxembourg),

Stage 4
28 June 1947 — Luxembourg City (Luxembourg) to Strasbourg,

Stage 5
29 June 1947 — Strasbourg to Besançon,

Stage 6
30 June 1947 — Besançon to Lyon,

Stage 7
2 July 1947 — Lyon to Grenoble,

Stage 8
3 July 1947 — Grenoble to Briançon,

Stage 9
5 July 1947 — Briançon to Digne,

Stage 10
6 July 1947 — Digne to Nice,

Stage 11
7 July 1947 — Nice to Marseille,

References

1947 Tour de France
Tour de France stages